Wythenshawe is a district of the city of Manchester, England. Historically in Cheshire, Wythenshawe was transferred in 1931 to the City of Manchester, which had begun building a massive housing estate there in the 1920s.

Wythenshawe includes the estates of Baguley, Benchill, Brooklands, Peel Hall, Newall Green, Woodhouse Park, Moss Nook, Northern Moor, Northenden and Sharston.

History
The name of Wythenshawe seems to come from the Old English wiðign = "withy tree" and sceaga = "wood" (compare dialectal word shaw). The three ancient townships of Northenden, Baguley and Northen Etchells formally became the present-day Wythenshawe when they were merged with Manchester in 1931. Until then, the name had referred only to Wythenshawe Hall and its grounds.

Due to spending cuts, the hall was temporarily closed to the public in 2010. One proposition was that Manchester City Council could sell the building to the National Trust.
A Friends Group was formed to support monthly open days and events at the hall. In March 2016, the roof of the hall and an upper floor were severely damaged by a fire in an arson attack, with the clock tower also damaged.

Immediately south of Wythenshawe is Manchester Airport, formerly called Ringway Airport. Before Ringway Airport was laid out, three farm fields between Rackhouse Road and Wythenshawe Road in Northern Moor, in what is now the north edge of Wythenshawe, were used as Manchester (Wythenshawe) Aerodrome. This was the UK's first municipal airfield, operating between April 1929 and early 1930. A barn was converted to act as the hangar and a farmhouse as the administration building. Temporary fuel pumps were installed. The last recorded flight from Wythenshawe Airport was on 19 June 1930.

Wythenshawe was in the Church of England Diocese of Chester until 1933, when it was transferred to the neighbouring Diocese of Manchester.

Housing and social history
Wythenshawe is Manchester's largest district, a massive housing estate that was started in the 1920s intended as a "garden city" where people could be rehoused away from industrial Manchester.

Part of Benchill (not the area southwest of Gladeside Road) and some areas in the north were built before World War II and called the Wythenshawe Ward of the City of Manchester. The rest was built after the Second World War, starting in the late 1940s as wartime building restrictions were relaxed. Parts of Baguley were still semi-rural in the 1960s, but now there is very little open country left.

The estate was built initially without many shops, amenities or services, and there was very little employment directly to hand. Although Northenden already had a shopping area on Palatine Road, the earliest new shops were built in the 1930s and included parades on Hollyhedge Road, and on Altrincham Road in Sharston (the latter was demolished in 1973 to make way for the M56 Sharston bypass). There were smaller local shops, usually a grocers—selling general household provisions, at Minsterly Parade (Woodhouse Park) and Haveley Circle (Benchill). However, it took decades for some areas of Wythenshawe to get their own neighbourhood shops, which meant residents had to travel or visit a mobile shop van when it visited their area. Various residents' associations were set up to address those problems, but progress was very slow.

After the Second World War, Wythenshawe eventually expanded, with several further shops being built (such as Haveley Circle, built in the early 1950s but demolished in the 1990s) and businesses were attracted to the area with the expansion of the Sharston Industrial Estate and, later, the Moss Nook and Roundthorn industrial complexes. Wythenshawe gradually acquired all the amenities and facilities that the original planners had neglected to include with the building of several new schools, shops, pubs and churches. The area also got its own hospital, and Wythenshawe Hospital grew out of the earlier Baguley Hospital in 1948. The largest shopping area was built in the 1960s in the town centre, known as the Wythenshawe Civic Centre, which has been expanded further since it was first built. In 1971, the Wythenshawe Forum was opened there, which included a library, a swimming pool, a restaurant, a bar and a theatre.

From the 1990s to the 2000s, the houses that were built and owned by the council were transferred to the control of local housing associations, such as Willow Park in east Wythenshawe and Parkway Green in west Wythenshawe. Both associations merged in 2013 to form the Wythenshawe Community Housing Group which is now responsible for around 14,000 homes in Wythenshawe.

In 2007, The New York Times described the housing estates in Wythenshawe as representing an "extreme pocket of social deprivation and alienation".

Most of the farm buildings in the Wythenshawe area were demolished when the estate was built. Some of them, like Hollyhedge Farm and Floats Hall, were left among the houses but suffered from vandalism and had to be demolished later. Some of the present housing estates were named after former farms.

Peel Hall Farm (which had a moat) survived for over 20 years  as its occupant lived on the proceeds of selling his land, but soon after he left, the property was vandalised and had to be demolished.

Newall Green Farm survived on the edge of the Newall Green housing estate area and was still occupied and run as a farm until the early 21st century when its last occupant died, when it was abandoned and fenced off. The buildings are listed. In 2006, a firm bought Newall Green Farm's buildings from Manchester Corporation. On 21 June 2014, vandals set fire to Newall Green Farm, and its roof was destroyed, but there are plans to turn the buildings into a care home for adults with learning disabilities, a working farm and a horse-riding centre.

Parks
Wythenshawe has twelve parks and 18 woodland areas including Wythenshawe Park, which was designated a Local Nature Reserve in 2011. At the centre of the park is the historic Wythenshawe Hall with its Civil War and Tatton heritage. The park also has riding stables, a horticulture centre, children's play area, athletics track, football pitches, tennis courts, bowls and golfing facilities.

Other parks include Hollyhedge Park, Peel Hall Park, Painswick Park and Baguley Park. Northenden's Riverside Park is the first new park to be established in the city in the 21st century.

Governance

The district is under the authority of Manchester City Council.

Manchester Wythenshawe was a parliamentary constituency created in 1950 and represented by Alf Morris of the Labour Party between 1964 and 1997. Before the 1997 election, the boundaries were redrawn and part of the neighbouring area of Sale included in the seat. The new constituency is called Wythenshawe and Sale East. In the same year, Alf Morris stepped down and was replaced by Paul Goggins. It is still considered a safe Labour seat, with Labour securing over 50% of the vote (and more than twice as many votes as its nearest rival) in the 1997, 2001 and 2005 elections. Labour kept the seat in the 2010 elections, though their share of the vote was decreased to 44.1%. In early 2014, following the death of Paul Goggins, a by-election was held. Labour candidate Mike Kane (a former Northenden councillor until 2008) won the seat with 55.3% of the vote, though voter turnout was low (28%). The 2017 general election saw the largest vote share for Labour in the history of both the current and former Wythenshawe seat with 62.2% of the vote and a 15,000 majority, though the 2019 election saw this fall back to approximate previous levels with a majority of 10,396 and a 53.3% share of the vote.

At the time of the 2001 UK Census, Wythenshawe was divided into six local government wards: Baguley, Benchill, Northenden, Sharston, Woodhouse Park and Brooklands (the latter being an area divided with the neighbouring borough of Trafford). Each ward was represented by three local councillors, giving Wythenshawe 21 of the 99 seats on Manchester City Council. Following a review by the Boundary Committee for England published in 2003, the ward of Benchill was abolished, and its former territory was divided between the wards of Northenden, Sharston, and Woodhouse Park.

Wythenshawe typically returns all Labour councillors in local elections, although in the 2008 elections the Liberal Democrats gained a seat in Northenden and a second seat (in the same area) in the 2010 elections. Labour regained these seats in the 2012 and 2014 elections. The Green Party have gained councillors in the Woodhouse Park ward in both the 2021 and 2022 elections.

Geography
It is surrounded by some of the most affluent areas in the UK. Altrincham and Hale lie to the south-west, Sale to the north-west and the Metropolitan Borough of Stockport to the east, with the suburbs of Gatley and Heald Green bordering onto Wythenshawe's eastern side. Manchester Airport, the third largest in the UK, is immediately to the south.

Shadow Moss is an area south of Ringway Road in the southeast corner of Wythenshawe. On this old map of Wythenshawe it is roughly the rectangular area between three country lanes with Heyhead at its northwest corner. On modern maps, its north edge is the southern branch of Ringway Road. It was partly in Northen Etchells township and partly in Styal parish. For many centuries it was a peat bog which was dug for peat fuel, locally called "turf"; local manorial law said that after digging peat the top living plant layer had to be lodged back to let more peat form afterwards. Each man's allocated part of the Moss was called his "moss room".

In the 19th century, manorial control was lost over what people used their moss rooms for, and an 1839 tithe map of Northen Etchells shows Northen Etchells's part of Shadow Moss as about 2/3 arable, about 1/3 meadow, one field as pasture, and one field as "uncultivated moors".

Later, the fertile lowland peat soil led to the area being much used for market gardening, with large areas under greenhouses. Of the people who worked there, many lived in Heyhead.

As of around 1970, Heyhead was a small settlement at the south end of Woodhouse Lane and the nearby part of Ringway Road. It comprised several terrace houses, a small shop, two or more old cottages, a chapel, and the Ringway Haulage Company. Manchester Airport's ground level car parking has been displaced from other areas and car parks have been formed to the north and south of the runways and under the approach path. The Heyhead area has been progressively replaced by level car parks, and by 2011 all of Heyhead's buildings had vanished (see History of Manchester Airport#Expansion).

Some greenhouses remain at the far east of the Shadow Moss area as of June 2012, but are used by private car parking operators (not associated with the airport company) and not for growing any crop. The last market gardener there, who grew tomatoes, closed his business in 2011 due to competition from highly mechanized enormous greenhouse establishments elsewhere.

Public services
Wythenshawe is policed by the city of Manchester Division of Greater Manchester Police. Wythenshawe's fire and rescue services are the responsibility of the Greater Manchester Fire and Rescue Service, and are based at a fire station on Brownley Road.

Transport
The M56 motorway, constructed in the 1970s as a continuation of the A5103 road (Princess Parkway), bisects east and west Wythenshawe. A bypass connecting it to the nearby M60 motorway was built through Sharston and opened in 1974.

The nearest railway station to Wythenshawe was located adjacent to Longley Lane at the edge of Sharston on the Cheshire Lines Railway from Stockport to Liverpool. Named Northenden for Wythenshawe, Northenden railway station was closed on 30 November 1964. Wythenshawe did not then have a public railway service for several decades, with the nearest stations being located in the neighbouring areas of Gatley, Heald Green and Altrincham. A station at Manchester Airport was opened in 1993.

The Airport Line branch of the Manchester Metrolink tram service includes twelve stops throughout Wythenshawe. The line opened on 3 November 2014, a year ahead of schedule. In addition to the building of the new Metrolink lines and stations, a new public transport hub was built in Wythenshawe Town Centre which opened in June 2015 and includes a new bus station and tram stop.

Economy

Approximately 43,000 people work in Wythenshawe. There are four areas of industrial activity (estates)—Moss Nook, Ringway (Airport Cargo Centre), Roundthorn and Sharston. It is home to Manchester Airport and Wythenshawe Hospital (part of Manchester University NHS Foundation Trust), which are two of the largest employers in the area. Many national and international companies have premises or main offices in Wythenshawe, including Timpson Ltd, HellermannTyton, Virgin Media, Vodafone and F. Duerr & Sons.

In 1934, George Hamer Scholes built the Wylex Works to produce electrical accessories. The company was later acquired by Electrium, which is now under Siemens' ownership.

Several greenfield and greyfield sites have been opened up to developers and there are several new housing developments within the area.

The town centre, known as the Civic Centre, was originally built in the 1960s. It expanded over the years and was renovated between 1999 and 2002 to include new stores and other new features, when the city council relinquished ownership and transferred it to St. Modwen Properties. The main shopping area now includes gates that are locked at night to prevent the vandalism that was seen in previous years. The Forum centre, which opened in 1971, houses a library, leisure centre, swimming pool, cafe and other amenities, has also been renovated in a more modern style. For thirty years it also housed the Forum Theatre, but this closed in 2002 and a health clinic and an adult education facility now occupy its space.

In 2007, Asda opened a new superstore on the site of the old Co-operative store (originally built by Woolco in the mid-1970s, which also features a multi-storey car park). A walkway going between the multi-storey car park and the large supermarket building now features a wall mosaic depicting various aspects of the town. After the demolition of two 1960s blocks of multi-storey flats in 2007, new buildings were constructed on the site including a new Wilko shop, office premises and a local authority services hub that provides a new frontage for the town centre from its north-facing aspect.

In June 2022, Manchester City Council announced the purchase of Wythenshawe town centre from St. Modwen Properties as part of wider plans to transform the town centre.

In the media
Wythenshawe is the outdoor filming location for the Channel 4 series Shameless, which shows various shots of the local tower-blocks, housing estates and other architecture unique to this area. Wythenshawe also housed the outdoor sets for the show, which were built on private property. Production moved from West Gorton (in East Manchester) in early 2007, following disruption to filming caused by local youths.

In 2009, Sarah Ferguson, Duchess of York (former wife of Prince Andrew) went to Wythenshawe to make a television documentary for ITV1 entitled The Duchess on the Estate. In it, she visited the Northern Moor area of Wythenshawe to meet locals and discuss their way of life, and to open a new local community centre. Both before and after its transmission, the documentary was criticised for being a self-serving publicity stunt by Ferguson and she was also criticised for her patronising attitude towards the local people.

Notable people

 Tyson Fury, professional boxer and heavyweight world champion, was born and raised in Wythenshawe.
 Harry H. Corbett, actor, attended Ross Place and Benchill Primary Schools and Sharston Secondary School in Wythenshawe.
 In 1972, English musician Johnny Marr of The Smiths, who was nine years old at the time, and his family moved to Wythenshawe, where he attended a local school.
 Marcus Rashford, Manchester United and England footballer, was born in Wythenshawe.
 Rob Gretton, Manager of Manchester band Joy Division and co owner of night club The Haçienda was born in Wythenshawe.
 Jason Orange, singer from Take That, lived in Wythenshawe as a child.
 Caroline Aherne, comedienne and actress, grew up in Wythenshawe from the age of two. 
 Coronation Street actors Simon Gregson and Nicholas Cochrane were born in Wythenshawe.
 Alf Wood, Manchester City, Shrewsbury Town, Millwall, Middlesbrough, Hull City, Walsall and Stafford Rangers footballer lived in Newall Green and attended Oldwood Junior School.
 Duncan Hallas, Trotskyist leader, grew up in Wythenshawe.
 Ravel Morrison, ex-Manchester United footballer, was born in Wythenshawe.
 Jimmy Egan, boxing trainer, Wythenshawe East Amateur Boxing Club, most notably trained Ricky Hatton and David Barnes during their amateur days.
 Paul Stewart lived in Northern Moor, Wythenshawe. He played football for Blackpool, Manchester City, Tottenham, Liverpool and England.
 John Bradley-West, actor, most notably of HBO series Game of Thrones, grew up and attended school in Wythenshawe.
  Michael Wood, historian, moved at the age of eight with his family to Wythenshawe where he attended Benchill Primary School.
 Syd Little, comedian, part of the Little and Large double act, attended Yew Tree School in Wythenshawe.
 Paul Young, lead singer of Mike and the Mechanics and Sad Café, was born in the Benchill area of Wythenshawe.
Steve McGarry, cartoonist, illustrator, story artist, President of the National Cartoonists Society, was born and raised in Benchill, where he attended St John and Thomas Primary School.
Joe Gallagher, professional boxing trainer to World Champions Anthony Crolla and Liam and Callum Smith, grew up in Benchill and attended St Peter's Primary School and St. John Plessington.
Shay Logan, professional footballer best known for his time at Aberdeen
 Shay Brennan, Manchester United footballer, born Manchester 1937. Brought up in Wythenshawe. Attended St. John and Thomas R.C. School. Debut for MUFC immediately after the Munich air crash in 1958. Played In the European  Cup Final of 1968, won by United. Played multiple times for Ireland.
 Cole Palmer, current Manchester City professional footballer, was born in Wythenshawe.
 Lukas Nmecha, current VfL Wolfsburg professional footballer, grew up in Wythenshawe.
 Slaughter & the Dogs are an English punk rock band formed in 1975 in Wythenshawe. They were one of the first punk rock bands in North West England.
 Kirsty Howard was a children's hospice advocate known for her fundraising efforts for Francis House Children's Hospice in Didsbury. Born in Wythenshawe.

See also

Listed buildings in Manchester-M22
Listed buildings in Manchester-M23
List of council estates in the United Kingdom

References

Notes

Bibliography

External links

Timeline of events in Wythenshawe's history
1927 air view of Wythenshawe
1927 air view of Hall Lane and Blackcarr Road area: note farm workers' cottages and farm buildings west of Baguley Hall, which was then called Maher's Farm and used for market gardening.

 
Areas of Manchester
History of Manchester
Local Nature Reserves in Greater Manchester
Manchester overspill estates